Winchell Trail is a  round trip, pedestrian-only trail in Minneapolis, Minnesota, United States, that runs along the west side of the Mississippi River between Franklin Avenue South and East 44th Street. Popular with bird watchers and naturalists, the rustic trail provides Upper Mississippi River gorge access and views. The trail is separate from the adjacent multi-use bicycle path, taking hikers past sandy beaches, an oak savanna restoration project, and the floodplain forest. The trail has multiple access points and the section from East 38th Street to East 44th Street is paved. Portions of the trail can be hiked in near solitude as its age and general destitute make it a widely forgotten place to explore.

Route description 

The Dakota people have lived along the shores of the Upper Mississippi River for many centuries. The contemporary route of Winchell Trail may have followed an original path created by Dakota people in the area. Residents and visitors who hike the trail experience what a native oak savanna looked like prior to European-American settlement.

Access points 
Winchell Trail has multiple access points from the West River Parkway trail of the Grand Rounds National Scenic Byway. The northern trailhead is near Franklin Avenue South and West River Parkway. The southern trailhead is near East 44th Street and West River Parkway. There is also a signed entrance to the trail at East 36th Street with several paths down to the oak savanna site. There are a few crescent-shaped parking lots along the trail route, two near East 36th Street and one near East 44th Street. Many of the various access points have racks for bicycles, which are not permitted on Winchell Trail or other natural surface paths in the gorge.

Major points of interest

List from north to south 
 Northern trailhead marker and Mesabi Iron Range boulder near Franklin Avenue South.
 Hajduk Spring near East 26th Street
White Sands Beach near East 28th Street
Minneapolis Rowing Club Boathouse near East Lake Street
Longfellow Beach near East 33rd Street
Overlook of the river gorge at East 36th Street
 Oak savanna restoration near East 36th Street
Southern trailhead marker and overlook of the river gorge near East 44th Street

Mesabi Iron Range boulder 
The northern trailhead features a large boulder with a bronze tribute plague describing the scientific contributions of the trail's namesake, Newton Horace Winchell. The boulder was brought from the Mesabi Iron Range by Winchell's eldest son. The plaque on it reads:The Winchell Trail marked by this boulder brought from the Mesabi Iron Range, was named in honor of the eminent geologist Newton Horace Winchell whose scientific studies along this river provided a measure for the time since the glacial period. His early appreciation of the economic importance of Minnesota's resources did much to preserve for the people some share in the state's mineral wealth.

Hajduk Spring 
Hajduk Spring in Minneapolis is a falling water source from the limestone bluff above the Mississippi River near East 26th Street. Named after an area resident who promoted the spring, Harry Hajduk (pronounced “Hi-duck”), by the parks board in 1977, it was a popular drinking water source and featured access paths and a platform to fill jugs. The original path to the spring off the main Winchell Trail has fallen into ruin. Water quality experts do not consider the spring's water to be drinkable because of the use of herbicides and fertilizers on nearby residential lawns.

Oak savanna restoration 

The mesic oak savanna near the end of East 36th Street is a unique and sensitive landscape. At this location, Winchell Trail splits off, taking hikers either down by the river while another path crosses the hilly restoration site with remnant prairie and oak savanna. The scattered oak trees are spread out enough that there is no closed canopy, giving way to prairie grasses, forbs, and clover lawn. Minneapolis Park and Recreation Board is considering enhancements, including closure of unsustainable trails, landscape restoration, and replacement of interpretive-educational signs.

Nearby sites 
The hiking path's southern terminus connects seamlessly to the shared-use, bicycle trail at West River Parkway and East 44th Street. Hikers can continue southward to Lock and Dam No. 1, Minnehaha Falls Lower Glen Trail in Minnehaha Park, and Fort Snelling State Park via Minnehaha Trail.

Construction 
Minneapolis Parks Superintendent Theodore Wirth commissioned Winchell Trail. It was constructed between 1912 and 1914, and later improved by the Works Progress Administration between 1936 and 1938, which included construction of several stone walls and staircases. The trail is named after Newton Horace Winchell, a Minnesota state geologist who surveyed the area of Minneapolis in the 1870s and published many works about measurement of the glacial age. The pathway was formally named "Winchell Trail" after his death in 1914. Winchell was not involved in its design or construction.

Management 
Jurisdiction of Winchell Trail is complex and overlapping. Running along the eastern edge of the greater Longfellow community of Minneapolis, the trail is part of the Mississippi National River and Recreation Area and Mississippi Gorge Regional Park. Minneapolis Park and Recreation Board is responsible for management and maintenance. In 1998, the Longfellow neighborhood council, park board, and National Park Service formed a partnership to restore the native prairie and oak savanna at East 36th Street. Since the early 2000s, there have been attempts by the city to clear woodlands along the bluff of invasive plant species such as buckthorn.

Maintenance 
Several potential enhancements to Winchell Trail were under consideration by the park board in 2019 as part of long-term planning. The park board may address inconsistent and worn railing and fencing, paved sections covered in soil and plant material, lack of natural surface trail alignment, and safety concerns. There are a number of undefined, non-designated natural surface paths besides the Winchell Trail in the area, but these were created by park users and are not considered sustainable.

Recognition 
In 2010, a local television station named Winchell Trail as one of the five best hiking trails in the Twin Cities, and in 2018 editors of a local magazine featured Winchell Trail in its review of the best hikes and walks in Minnesota, including it in the category for "Rigorous Hikes for the Adventurer."

See also 
 Dakota War of 1862
 List of shared-use paths in Minneapolis

References

External links
 Google Maps: Winchell Trail
 Mississippi River Gorge Regional Park
 Walks and Hikes: Winchell Trail
 Winchell Trail map

Hiking trails in Minnesota
Mississippi Gorge
Mississippi National River and Recreation Area
National Recreation Trails in Minnesota
Parks in Minneapolis
Protected areas of Hennepin County, Minnesota
Works Progress Administration in Minnesota